Armin Hagen Freiherr von Hoyningen-Huene (28 December 1942) is a German-American photographer, artist, filmmaker, clothing designer/sewer, and model best known by his stage name Peter Berlin. In the early to mid-1970s. 

His two films, Nights in Black Leather (1973) and That Boy (1974) (credited in the latter as Peter Burian) helped bring gay male erotic films artistic legitimacy.

Early life
Peter Berlin was born December 28, 1942, in German-occupied Łódź, Poland, but he grew up in an aristocratic family in Berlin, Germany.  He is the second of the three children. The extended family included the Russian American 1920s and 1930s fashion photographer George Hoyningen-Huene.

Photography 
He received post-secondary education in Germany as a photo-technician. In his early 20s, he worked as a photographer for an interview program on German television, photographing some of Europe's celebrities and film stars, including Alfred Hitchcock, Catherine Deneuve, Bridgette Bardot and Klaus Kinski

Fashions
Berlin designed and sewed all of his clothing without a pattern.  He also was a painter and illustrator. He began photographing himself in erotic poses and making skin-tight clothes to wear as he cruised the parks and train stations of Berlin, and the streets of Rome, Paris, New York and San Francisco. Many of his designs are now seen in the fashion works of such international designers such as Jean Paul Gaultier.

Filmmaking and celebrity

In the early 1970s, Berlin moved to San Francisco and became a fixture on the streets with his highly suggestive clothing and constant cruising. He collaborated with friend Richard Abel on a 16 mm hard-core porn film entitled Nights in Black Leather (1973) in which he played the lead role. Berlin's poster for the film  helped make Nights in Black Leather an underground hit.

As a follow-up, Berlin directed, produced, wrote, and starred in That Boy (1974). He also made four short films in the mid- to late-1970s, which were primarily sold as 8 mm "loops" by mail order. His self-portraits were published and sold. He was also the subject of several Robert Mapplethorpe photographs, five drawings by Tom of Finland, and at least one photograph by Andy Warhol. Two Robert Mapplethorpe Polaroid images of Berlin can be seen in the 2008 book, Mapplethorpe: Polaroids, and the Whitney Museum of American Art exhibition of the same name. Some of his famous friends were Salvador and Gala Dali, Warhol, New York fashion designer Koos, and painter Jochen Labriola. He was acquainted with ballet dancer Rudolf Nureyev.

Photography

Berlin's photographs and artwork have been exhibited around the world, including the exhibition "Split/Vision" (New York, 1986), curated by Mapplethorpe, and in the exhibition "Berlin on Berlin" (2006) at the Leslie Lohman Gallery in New York.

Although he retreated from the limelight in the 1980s, he continues to make videos of himself and lives quietly in San Francisco, where he is still frequently recognized on the streets.

He was trained in Germany as a photo technician in the 1960s.

Comeback 

In 2005, filmmaker and writer Jim Tushinski directed and co-produced (with Lawrence Helman), the feature-length documentary That Man: Peter Berlin, which began a resurgence of interest in Berlin's works. The documentary premiered at the 2005 Berlin Film Festival and garnered several awards at film festivals worldwide, reconnecting Berlin with his older fans and introducing him to a new generation. In 2006, Berlin launched a web site devoted to his work.

Filmography
Long features
1973: Nights in Black Leather (actor)
1974: That Boy (director, producer, writer, actor) (credited as Peter Burian)
Documentary
2005: That Man: Peter Berlin
Shorts
1973: Waldeslust
1974-6: Search
1974-6: Ciro and Peter
1976-7: Blueboys

Awards
2007: GayVN Awards, Category: "2007 GayVN Hall of Fame Inductees"

See also 
 List of pornographic movie studios
List of male performers in gay porn films

References

Further reading 
Website of the Hoyningen-Huene family
"Creating Peter Berlin", text and photos by Dennis Forbes—article in After Dark (magazine) February 1975, pages 44–51, with photographic portfolio of Peter Berlin

Sources
"Berlin on Berlin" interview by Robert W. Richards
ManNet Review: "That Man: SE" 
That Man: Peter Berlin reviews by "Dom79" and "TheCygnet"

External links
Peter Berlin official website

That Man: Peter Berlin official Web site [broken link]
That Man Peter Berlin Original Motion Picture Soundtrack

1942 births
German male pornographic film actors
Photographers from Berlin
Barons of Germany
Actors in gay pornographic films
German LGBT photographers
Living people
German emigrants to the United States